Dragging the Classics: The Brady Bunch is a television special that was released on the streaming service Paramount+ on June 30, 2021. The special sees drag queens from RuPaul's Drag Race and original cast members from The Brady Bunch recreating the season two episode "Will the Real Jan Brady Please Stand Up?".

Cast
 Bianca Del Rio as Carol Brady
 Shea Couleé as Marcia Brady
 Kylie Sonique Love as Jan Brady
 Kandy Muse as Cindy Brady
 Barry Williams as Mike Brady
 BenDeLaCreme as Greg Brady
 Christopher Knight as Peter Brady
 Mike Lookinland as Bobby Brady
 Nina West as Alice
 RuPaul as the Wig Attendant
 Michelle Visage as Helen
 Eve Plumb as Lucy
 Susan Olsen as Margie

References

2020s American television specials
2021 television specials
2021 in American television
Paramount+ original programming
RuPaul's Drag Race
The Brady Bunch
Drag (clothing) television shows
Television remakes